The VTB United League All-Star Game is a yearly event that includes an exhibition game in which the best players of the VTB United League play against each other. The inaugural event was organised for the first time on February 11, 2017, during the 2016–17 season. Additionally, the All-Star Event includes a dunk contest and a three-point contest.

Games

Slam-Dunk champions

Three-point contest winners

Players with most appearances

References

VTB United League
Basketball all-star games